The Porto Alegre Public Market, in downtown Porto Alegre, Brazil, is the city's oldest public market. It also is an important historic landmark and a well-known meeting point, with many coffee shops and restaurants.

The cornerstone was laid on 29 August 1864, and it was constructed over an earlier and smaller market. Frederico Heydtmann designed the building, but his plan was substantially altered and enlarged. The inauguration took place on 3 October 1869. In 1886, 24 small shops were installed in the inner yard.

In 1912, while undergoing renovation, a fire destroyed all the stalls in the inner area. A second floor was added by 1913. The market suffered from a major flood in 1941, and from additional fires in 1976, 1979 and 2013. In the administration of Telmo Thompson Flores, it ran the risk of being demolished, but the outcry led to the reconsideration of the decision.

In 1990 the City administration organized a multidisciplinary team to develop a Restoration Project, which focused on the following goals:

Rescue of the aesthetic quality of the building;
Optimizing supply potentials;
Creation of spaces of sociability.

The works included a modern structure of steel and glass to cover the large area of the inner yard, regained the visual perception of the inner arcades, renewed the internal circulations, created new living spaces, and deployed network infrastructure needed to handle the daily activities of a large and busy market.

The new cover allowed the integration between the ground floor and second floor. The second floor, where there were offices and public offices before, now has several popular establishments such as restaurants, snack bars, and coffee shops. With the works, the market also expanded its number of shops. The inauguration took place on 19 March 1997.

The Public Market is part of the traditions of the city, mainly for its "Banca 40" (an ice cream parlor), its centenary restaurant Gambrinus and one of the most traditional bars in town, the 101 years old Bar Naval (Navy Bar). There are about 109 shops, selling fresh produce and baked goods, locally raised meats and dairy products, and various other food items and also handcrafted goods. There are over 100,000 items for sale.

On 6 July 2013, the Public Market caught fire again. The fire is believed to have started at 20h30 on the upper floor at the corner of Avenida Borges de Medeiros and Júlio de Castilhos. Recent reports say that no people were injured, but 30% of the structure appeared to have burned down.

See also 

 Architecture of Porto Alegre

Notes

References
Franco, Sérgio da Costa. Guia Histórico de Porto Alegre. Porto Alegre: Editora da Universidade (UFRGS)/Prefeitura Municipal, 1988

Buildings and structures in Porto Alegre
Retail markets in Brazil
Tourist attractions in Porto Alegre